Colonel James Porter (fl.1686–1701) was an Irish politician and supporter of the Catholic King James II.

He was a Groom of the Bedchamber to King James II in 1686. He was elected a Member of Parliament for Fethard, County Wexford in the 1689 Patriot Parliament of Ireland summoned by the King. During the Williamite War in Ireland, he was a major, and then a lieutenant colonel, in Fitz-James’s Regiment of Infantry.

In 1689 was sent to Château de Saint-Germain-en-Laye in France by James and was soon dispatched on fruitless diplomatic missions to seek support from the French King Louis XIV and the Pope. He remained at the Jacobite court in France after James had left Ireland in 1690, and he was attainted by the Williamites in 1691. He was later made Vice-Chamberlain of the Household in France on the accession in 1701 of James Francis Edward Stuart as the de jure King of England, Scotland and Ireland.

References

Year of birth unknown
Year of death unknown
Irish Jacobites
Irish MPs 1689
Irish soldiers in the army of James II of England
Members of the Parliament of Ireland (pre-1801) for County Wexford constituencies
People convicted under a bill of attainder